Silvano Maria Tomasi C.S. (born 12 October 1940) is an Italian prelate of the Catholic Church who has served as the Special Delegate to the Sovereign Military Order of Malta since 1 November 2020. He was the Permanent Observer of the Holy See to the United Nations in Geneva from 2003 to 2016. He previously worked in the Roman Curia, became an archbishop in 1996, and represented the Holy See as an apostolic nuncio in Africa from 1996 to 2003.

Pope Francis raised him to the rank of cardinal on 28 November 2020.

Early life
He was born in Casoni di Mussolente, Italy. On 31 May 1965 he was ordained as priest of the Congregation of the Missionaries of St. Charles (Scalabrini). He earned his Ph.D. in sociology from Fordham University. From 1970 to 1974 he was assistant professor of sociology at the City University of New York and the New School for Social Research. He co-founded the Center for Migration Studies, a think tank based in New York, and he founded and edited the journal International Migration Review. In 1973 he told the New York Times that poor Italian immigrants in New York did not take advantage of government assistance programs fearing "humiliation". He also authored a book on the historic legacy of New York's Italian parishes. From 1983 to 1987, he was Director of the newly created Office for the Pastoral Care of Migrants and Refugees of the United States Conference of Catholic Bishops.

On 27 June 1989  Pope John Paul II appointed him Secretary of the Pontifical Council for Pastoral Care of Migrants and Itinerant Peoples. He was named titular Archbishop of Cercina and Apostolic Nuncio to Eritrea and Ethiopia on 27 June 1996, consecrated on 17 August 1996 by Cardinal Angelo Sodano, and named Apostolic Delegate to Djibouti on 1 October 1996. He was transferred to the titular see of Acelum on 24 April 1999. His title changed to Apostolic Nuncio to Djibouti on 23 December 2000.

Geneva role
On 10 June 2003, Tomasi was appointed Permanent Observer of the Holy See to the United Nations in Geneva.

He was widely criticised in September 2009 following a speech in which he praised the Church's record on child sex abuse in comparison with that of other organisations by arguing that "Of all priests involved in the abuses, 80 to 90 percent belong to this sexual orientation minority which is sexually engaged with adolescent boys between the ages of 11 and 17" and "As the Catholic church has been busy cleaning its own house, it would be good if other institutions and authorities, where the major part of abuses are reported, could do the same and inform the media about it."

Tomasi "encouraged passage of an international protocol that would give children a direct line of communication to local and international authorities when they are victims of violence or their rights are violated.... Tomasi...said the measure "will become a significant instrument of the human rights system." The document would add to the protections provided in the United Nations Convention on the Rights of the Child. Speaking on 8 June 2011 at the U.N. International Labor Conference in Geneva, Archbishop Tomasi urged that all involved in "the burgeoning and mercurial economic system" work to foster fundamental principles that ensure respect for the common good and protection of the most vulnerable.

In 2014 the U.N. Committee on the Rights of the Child issued a report described as "a scathing indictment of the Vatican’s handling of child sexual abuse cases involving clerics, releasing a report that included criticism of church teachings on homosexuality, gender equality and abortion" which was seen as an indictment of the Catholic Church's handling of child sexual abuse cases involving clerics, going beyond how the church managed abuse allegations to include criticism of its teachings on homosexuality, gender equality and abortion. Archbishop Tomasi appeared before a U.N. committee in Geneva. Vatican officials said they were still studying the findings, but responded angrily to what they described as recommendations that were ideologically biased. Fr Thomas Rosica said that the U.N. report wrongly looked at Catholicism as a single organisation. Tomasi said that he suspected pro-gay rights NGOs had influenced the committee and "reinforced an ideological line" in the UN.

No matter how sophisticated autonomous weapons systems are, they can never comply with international human rights law. "Meaningful human involvement is absolutely essential in decisions affecting the life and death of human beings," Archbishop Tomasi, told experts meeting 13–16 May to discuss lethal autonomous weapons systems such as drones. Archbishop Tomasi said it was essential "to recognise that autonomous weapon systems can never replace the human capacity for moral reasoning, including in the context of war." "The development of autonomous weapon systems will ultimately lead to widespread proliferation," he said, and "the development of complex autonomous weapon systems which remove the human actor from lethal decision-making is short-sighted and may irreversibly alter the nature of warfare in a less humane direction, leading to consequences we cannot possibly foresee, but that will in any case increase the dehumanisation of warfare."

Speaking to Vatican Radio in August 2014 Archbishop Tomasi commented that "Maybe military action is necessary at this moment" in Iraq. He told Vatican Radio that "what seems to be particularly important in the letter of the Holy Father to Ban Ki-moon is the expressions that he uses: the tragic situation 'compels' the international community. There is a moral imperative, so to (speak), a necessity to act." He added that the UN charter notes that at times "dialogue, negotiations, fail and large numbers of people find themselves at risk: at risk of genocide, at risk of having their fundamental, their basic human rights violated. In this case, when every other means has been attempted, article 42 of the Charter of the United Nations becomes possible justification for not only imposing sanctions of economic nature on the state or the group or the region that violates the basic human rights of people, but also to use force. All the force that is necessary to stop this evil and this tragedy."

In 2015 Tomasi said jihadists were committing "genocide" and must be stopped. He said: "What's needed is a co-ordinated and well-thought-out coalition to do everything possible to achieve a political settlement without violence. But if that's not possible, then the use of force will be necessary." He added: "We have to stop this kind of genocide. Otherwise we'll be crying out in the future about why we didn't so something, why we allowed such a terrible tragedy to happen."

Tomasi retired from the diplomatic service upon the announcement of the appointment of his successor in Geneva on 13 February 2016. He retains the title "Apostolic Nuncio". In the second half of 2016, Tomasi managed the reorganization of several offices of the Roman Curia to form the new Dicastery for Promoting Integral Human Development, a "mammoth challenge" accomplished "with tact, diplomacy, trustworthiness and genuine affability".

Cardinal
On 25 October 2020, Pope Francis announced he would raise him to the rank of cardinal at a consistory scheduled for 28 November 2020. At that consistory, Pope France made him Cardinal-Deacon of San Nicola in Carcere.

On 1 November 2020, Pope Francis appointed Tomasi his Special Delegate to the Sovereign Military Order of Malta.

See also
Cardinals created by Pope Francis
 List of heads of the diplomatic missions of the Holy See

References

External links
 
 Interview (2016) at Zenit News

1940 births
Living people
People from Vicenza
Fordham University alumni
Scalabrinians
Officials of the Roman Curia
20th-century Italian Roman Catholic titular archbishops
Apostolic Nuncios to Eritrea
Apostolic Nuncios to Djibouti
Apostolic Nuncios to Ethiopia
Permanent Observers of the Holy See to the United Nations
Cardinals created by Pope Francis
21st-century Italian cardinals